Saintfield Cricket Club is a cricket club in Saintfield, County Down, Northern Ireland, playing in League 1 of the NCU Senior League.

Honours
NCU Junior Cup: 1
2003

References

External links
Saintfield Cricket Club

Cricket clubs in County Down
NCU Senior League members
Cricket clubs in Northern Ireland